Teddy Brown (born Abraham Himmelbrand, 25 May 1900 –  29 April 1946) was an American entertainer and musician who spent the latter part of his life performing in Britain.  His main musical instrument was the xylophone.

Life and career
He first played in the New York Philharmonic Orchestra, but moved to the field of popular music in the late 1910s. He was a percussionist for a time with Julius Lenzberg's Riverside Theatre Orchestra, and his earliest recordings were xylophone solos with Lenzberg's band on Edison Records in 1919 and 1920.

He arrived in London in 1925, with Joseph C. Smith and his Orchestra. The next year he formed his own orchestra, playing at the Café de Paris. He went on to play in other nightclubs both in London and Paris including the Kit Kat Club, often performing as a solo act, or playing xylophone with a piano accompaniment. The custom-made Besson xylophone he played had a five-octave range, one more than the normal. In 1927, the UK division of Lee de Forest's Phonofilm made a short film of Brown playing this instrument.  He also played a six-octave instrument.

He was noted for his rotund appearance, approaching 400 pounds (180 kg) in weight, and was often compared to (or considered the British answer to) another rotund band leader of the same era, Paul Whiteman.  He was sometimes billed as "The Great Xylophonist", emphasising his physical size.    Besides the xylophone, Brown played the other percussion instruments very well, in addition to the tenor saxophone. He also whistled melodies while playing percussion, and his act included comic patter.   Brown's rapid-fire style, performing on fast-paced tunes, was an early influence on percussionist and bandleader Spike Jones, who would launch his own career a decade later.

As Brown's considerable percussive skills and fame in the UK spread, he appeared in an early sound feature-length movie in 1930, co-directed by a young Alfred Hitchcock, titled Elstree Calling, a musical variety review that answered Paul Whiteman's music review feature film of the same year, King of Jazz, with both films featuring early colour sequences.  Elstree was the movie and radio studio complex where many famous films and radio shows were produced in the early days of British media entertainment.  A variety of impressive older musical and comedic vaudeville acts and new talent were featured in each of the two films. His third appearance in the film was the most impressive, as he plays the xylophone with amazingly fast precision, using only one hand at a time, and sometimes behind his back.  He played "a continuous run of notes right down the full length of the instrument while simultaneously spinning his entire body around through 360 degrees... so swiftly and effortlessly that it is difficult to see how it is done, although repeated [film] viewings reveal that he achieves the continuity of playing by swapping from his right hand to his left and back to his right wile spinning".

From 1931 on Brown played xylophone on the radio, in films and on the variety stage. His appearance was dapper but stout, but he was nimble and often danced around the xylophone while playing. He appeared in the Royal Variety Performance in 1931. He was associated with The Crazy Gang, and was often the subject of their jokes.

He was a member of the British Grand Order of Water Rats. He was King Rat in 1946, although his term was cut short as he died of a Heart Attack in his hotel room in Birmingham in 1946, at age 45, after appearing in a concert at the Wolverhampton Hippodrome.

Selected filmography
 Elstree Calling (1930)
 The Indiscretions of Eve (1932)
 On the Air (1934)
 København, Kalundborg og - ? (1934)
 Variety Parade (1936)
 Convict 99 (1938) as Slim Charlie

References

Oxford Companion to Popular Music published by Oxford University Press, 1991

External links
 
 
  (s.a. British Pathé)
 

1900 births
1946 deaths
Xylophonists
Snare drummers
American percussionists
British male drummers
20th-century American drummers
American male drummers
20th-century American male musicians